Bairiki is a settlement in South Tarawa of Kiribati. The State House, the National Stadium, the High Commissions of Australia and New Zealand as well as the embassy of China, and most of the Government Ministries are based in Bairiki. Bairiki is administered by the Teinainano Urban Council or TUC. As at the 2010 Census the population of Bairiki was 3,524.

Overview
Bairiki was sometimes considered the capital of Kiribati because at one time both the Parliament and the Presidency (and main administrative offices) were located there.  However Parliament moved to Ambo in 2000, and the various ministries are scattered throughout South Tarawa, from Betio to Bikenibeu.

Geography 
Bairiki is an islet near the Western end of South Tarawa.  It is joined to Betio by the Nippon Causeway, which opened in 1989, and is also joined to Naanekai by a causeway, forming part of a continuous road which links South Tarawa from Betio in the West to Bonriki International Airport in the East.

Bairiki is a small islet, with a land area of less than half a square km.  Much of the land is occupied by the Government itself, including the Bairiki National Stadium and the main offices of many of the Government ministries, and by foreign High Commissions with their associated residences.  The village community of Bairiki lives in very crowded conditions, and rapid population growth is causing significant problems.

Education

King George V School, a secondary school for boys, opened in Bairiki in 1922. It later moved to Abemama.

Transport

The city has road connections to Betio and Nanikai

See also 
Bairiki National Stadium

References

External links 

South Tarawa
Populated places in Kiribati
Capitals in Oceania